River Maine may refer to:
River Maine (County Antrim), Northern Ireland
River Maine (County Kerry), Ireland
Maine River (Maine), United States
Maine (river), France

See also
Main River (disambiguation)